Major John Simpson VC (29 January 1826 – 27 October 1884) was a Scottish recipient of the Victoria Cross, the highest and most prestigious award for gallantry in the face of the enemy that can be awarded to British and Commonwealth forces.

Simpson, 32 years old, was a quartermaster-sergeant in the 42nd Regiment of Foot, British Army, later the Black Watch (Royal Highlanders), during the Indian Mutiny on 15 April 1858. During the attack on Fort Ruhya, British India, Simpson volunteered to go to an exposed point within  of the parapet of the fort under heavy fire and carried back a lieutenant and a private, both of whom were seriously wounded.

Simpson was later commissioned as a quartermaster and in 1878 he transferred to the Militia. In 1881 he was granted the honorary rank of Captain and in 1883 he was promoted Major. His grave and memorial are at Balbeggie Churchyard, St. Martin's, near Perth, Scotland. His medal is on display in the United States at the Natural History Museum of Los Angeles County, in Los Angeles.

References

Monuments to Courage (David Harvey, 1999)
The Register of the Victoria Cross (This England, 1997)
Scotland's Forgotten Valour (Graham Ross, 1995)

External links
Location of grave and VC medal (Tayside)

1826 births
1884 deaths
Military personnel from Edinburgh
Black Watch soldiers
British Militia officers
Black Watch officers
British recipients of the Victoria Cross
Indian Rebellion of 1857 recipients of the Victoria Cross
British Army personnel of the Crimean War
British Army recipients of the Victoria Cross